Desmotrichum is a genus of brown algae. One species is accepted in AlgaeBase, Desmotrichum plumosum.

References

Chordariaceae
Brown algae genera
Taxa named by Friedrich Traugott Kützing